Founded in 2012, Mallzee is a fashion mobile commerce company and shopping application. Its application allows online shoppers with a smartphone to access millions of products from over 100 fashion brands around the world. The mobile app was launched in September 2013 and uses a 'like' or 'dislike' swiping interface and has since been labelled as the 'Tinder of fashion', in reference to the Tinder app. In 2015, the application was launched in the US.

History 

Mallzee was founded in December 2012 by Cally Russell and is based in Edinburgh. He worked at public affairs and PR company Weber Shandwick for six months before starting  Student Punch, an online student magazine. During an interview, Russell said that the inspiration behind Mallzee was wanting to create something that really helped people find clothes online.

The original launch of Mallzee took place during London Fashion Week in September 2013. Mallzee launched the beta version of their app for iPhone and Android at London Fashion Week. They used a promotion video titled 'Mallzee found me the perfect dress' featuring fictional character Rosie. The video received positive coverage.

 Growth 
The company has grown to host over 200 global fashion brands and has expanded their operations into the US.

Mallzee has grown to a team of twenty-three employees, including Callum Stuart as chief operating officer(COO) and Jamie Sutherland as chief technology officer (CTO), a finalist at Scotland IS awards.

In February 2015 Mallzee announced an agreement with Samsung in the UK and Ireland. This deal allowed them to feature Mallzee in a number of advertisements including the Galaxy Gifts and the Samsung Galaxy app store, with promotional pricing for Samsung customers.

In November 2015 Mallzee, which had always been focused principally in UK, released a version of the app for the US market. The release was made in time for Black Friday. Today, it claims a "seven-figure" user base spread across 125 countries. Mallzee's CEO explained that the expansion will attract more big brands such as Zara, H&M and Urban Outfitters to join their service and create a better offering for all of their customers.

Russell commented, "We know that Mallzee is going to change how Americans shop and save money." 

 Usage 

Mallzee allows customers to compare and purchase from the product range of many high street fashion retailers. It uses a swiping interface  (similar to the Tinder app) which allows the user to 'like' or 'dislike' a product. Swipe data is used for personalising the user experience and collecting trending data.

The website and app has a search  function on the homepage. There is also the option to purchase immediately from search and swipe modes.

In 2017 Mallzee released a new version of the app on the [iOS Appstore] which included single transaction multiple retailer purchasing.

 Financial 
Mallzee in early 2013 raised an initial seed round of £75,000 from family and friends, to get its app to market. In April 2013 Mallzee raised an additional £150,000 from a group of private investors from Edinburgh led by Andrew Barrie. Mallzee also won a Scottish EDGE award in the form of a £42,899 grant.

One year after its presence in the market, Mallzee completed a seed plus round of funding equal to £500,000. Among main investors there were Par Equity and the Scottish Investment Bank, together with a number of well-known angel investors on the Scottish tech scene such as Gareth Williams and Rob Dobson. The success of the seed funding has facilitated the growth both in UK and abroad, and allowed to increase the staff up to fourteen members.

In June 2014 Mallzee raised £2.5 million. This was led by the Royal Mail Group, a postal service company in the United Kingdom. Royal Mail Group also got contributions from the Scottish Investment Bank, Par Equity, and a group of entrepreneurs including Gareth Williams, CEO of Skyscanner.

Losses filed at the company via Companies House have been increasing rapidly. In 2014 they were £95k, 2015 £381k, 2016 £1.25m, 2017 £2.7m, 2018 £830k and in 2019 £1.2m.

Cally Russell appeared on the BBC show Dragons' Den in February 2015. Russell pitched his smartphone application to the Dragons and got an offer from IT entrepreneur and investor Peter Jones. The offer was £75,000 investment in exchange for 15 percent of the company. Russell turned down the offer because he did not want to give away so much equity in his company. Mallzee then went on to secure £2.5 million investment, much of it from direct inbound enquiries following the airing of Dragons' Den.

Peter Jones coined the phrase "Ballsy for Mallzee" and said that he had a hunch that the app could be the next £100 million or a £0 business.

 Reception 
 Customers 
The Mallzee application can be downloaded from both App Store and from Google Play. In May 2017, Mallzee had over 1 million users.

 Reviews 
Forbes stated that "You're Either A Dedicated Follower of Fashion, Or Have Mallzee on Your iPhone."

Commenting on the funding round, Paul Munn, director at Par Equity, said: "Mallzee is an innovative product addressing a fast changing consumer market. Choice abounds but shoppers and retailers want technology to help them make sense of the market.  The team at Mallzee have made significant progress to date and this investment will provide a runway for the business in its next stage of growth and development."

Yahoo named Mallzee as "one of 6 apps that will change the way we shop forever".

Mallzee CEO Cally Russell was named in the 2016 inaugural Forbes'' Retail & Commerce Europe "30 Under 30".

He also appeared on the cover of Drapers in January 2017 as one of their 30 Under 30 fashion influencers.

Mobile commerce 
Mallzee has pioneered M-Commerce, although there are other competitors in the online space including Lyst and Shopcade. Since Mallzee's launch, other similar applications have emerged such as Grabble, which launched by Daniel Murray and Joel Freeman in 2014. Grabble uses a similar swipe shopping style as Mallzee and has also been coined 'The Tinder for Fashion', the same title that Mallzee has been given by a list of fashion bloggers and media companies. However, in 2015 Mallzee's user base was twice that of Grabble's.

See also
Tinder
Shopcade

References 

Geosocial networking
Mobile social software
Computer-related introductions in 2012
Clothing brands
British brands
Android (operating system) software
Companies based in Edinburgh
Online retailers of the United Kingdom
Real-time web
IOS software
British social networking websites
Fashion websites